The 2009 Banja Luka Challenger was a professional tennis tournament played on outdoor red clay courts. It was the eighth edition of the tournament which was part of the 2009 ATP Challenger Tour. It took place in Banja Luka, Bosnia and Herzegovina between 14 and 20 September 2009.

Singles main draw entrants

Seeds

 Rankings are as of August 31, 2009.

Other entrants
The following players received wildcards into the singles main draw:
  Sven Lalić
  Aleksandar Marić
  Marko Stanić
  Arsenije Zlatanović

The following players received entry from the qualifying draw:
  Attila Balázs
  Cătălin Gârd
  Marek Semjan
  Goran Tošić

Champions

Singles

 Daniel Gimeno-Traver def.  Julian Reister, 6–4, 6–1

Doubles

 Dustin Brown /  Rainer Eitzinger def.  Ismar Gorčić /  Simone Vagnozzi, 6–4, 6–3

External links
Official site
ITF Search 
2009 Draws

Banja Luka Challenger
2009 in Bosnia and Herzegovina sport
Banja Luka Challenger